The Asian Shooting Confederation (ASC) is an association of the International Shooting Sport Federation's member federations from Asia.

Competitions administered by the ASC
Asian Shooting Championships
Shooting at the Asian Games

References

External links
Asian Shooting Confederation

Sports governing bodies in Asia
Shooting sports in Asia
Shooting sports organizations